Mark Sweet is an American hypnotherapist, comedian, magician and host.

Early life and education 
He was born September 20, 1951 in Detroit, Michigan. Sweet's father, Fred Sweet, used to manage the TeleNews movie theater in downtown Detroit.

A few blocks away was the magic store Fox Fun ‘N Magic, owned by Roy Kissell. Though Sweet was only 5 years old, Roy began teaching him magic and Sweet became his protégé. On weekends Sweet did shows in the family's garage for the neighborhood children. Sweet's mother Fay worked for Detroit pediatricians and knew when all the children's birthdays were, so Sweet performed magic shows at children's birthday parties every weekend, which led to larger bookings.

At age 16 Sweet landed his first talent agents, Al Rice and John Bonino at Gail & Rice in Detroit.

Career 
Sweet's first gig was at the Detroit Boat Club on Belle Isle. This launched a 25-year career performing magic and comedy for General Motors.  In 1972, a fellow magician introduced Sweet to his trade show agent who got him a meeting with the Willy Wonka company, and Sweet ended up performing as Willy Wonka and acting as their spokesperson for 23 years.
Sweet and his wife Julie moved to Los Angeles in 1981, and Sweet was soon doing warm-up for studio audiences. Garry Shandling requested Sweet to warm up It’s Garry Shandling's Show, which he did for 6 years. In addition, Jerry Van Dyke, whom Sweet had met in the 1970s, introduced Sweet to Barry Kemp, the creator of Newhart and Coach. Sweet went on to warm up audiences at Coach for 9 years, and has done warm-up for some of the biggest sitcoms on TV including: Roseanne; Cheers; The Larry Sanders Show; Suddenly Susan; Everybody Loves Raymond; Yes, Dear; Mike & Molly; Dharma & Greg; According to Jim; Reba; The Big Bang Theory; and Two and a Half Men.

Sweet's warm-up accomplishments are noted in former NBC President of Entertainment Warren Littlefield’s book Top of the Rock. Littlefield calls Sweet “The king of multi-camera comedy audience warm-up. Over four thousand episodes from Cheers to Mike & Molly.”

Hypnotherapy 
Sweet became interested in hypnosis at an early age, and is now a certified clinical hypnotherapist. He regularly combines his talent for stand-up comedy and hypnosis in a comedy hypnotism show which he's performed on such shows as Late Night With Jimmy Fallon and The Jamie Kennedy Experiment. He also regularly performs at The Ice House in Pasadena, CA.

References

External links 
MarkSweet.com

Living people
American male comedians
21st-century American comedians
American hypnotists
American television personalities
1951 births